Stephen Shannon Jewett (September 18, 1858 – October 24, 1932) was an American lawyer and Republican Party politician who served as the Speaker of the New Hampshire House of Representatives.

Jewett was born to John G. and Carrie E. (Shannon) Jewett in that part of Gilford, New Hampshire, that is now Laconia, New Hampshire on September 18, 1858.

Jewett was admitted to the New Hampshire bar in March 1880.

Jewett married Annie L. Bray of Bradford, England, on June 30, 1880. They had one child, a son, Theo S. Jewett.

Jewett was a 32nd degree Mason.

Jewett was elected to the New Hampshire House of Representatives in the 1894 election and chosen as the Speaker when the legislature was organized in 1895. In 1916, he was president of the New Hampshire Bar Association.

Jewett died at his home in Laconia October 24, 1932.

Notes

 

1858 births
1932 deaths
New Hampshire lawyers
People from Laconia, New Hampshire
Speakers of the New Hampshire House of Representatives
Republican Party members of the New Hampshire House of Representatives